The Intercontinental Derby, also known as the Eternal Rivalry, is the name given to any basketball match between Fenerbahçe SK and Galatasaray SK, teams of the Asian and the European parts of Istanbul respectively. Fenerbahçe is the most successful of the two clubs, having won more overall trophies in past seasons (including the highest level tier of European basketball, the EuroLeague trophy, where the winners are considered the biggest team of Europe) and derby games.

History
According to the official records, in Turkey, basketball was first played in 1904 at Robert College. An American physical education teacher laid the foundations of this sport in Turkey. Seven years later, in 1911, Ahmet Robenson, a physical education teacher at a high school, decided to introduce a new game to the students. Robenson popularized this sport in Turkey.

Galatasaray are considered to be the pioneers in Turkish basketball, and the sport has always been very important for the club. The team have won 11 national championship titles and 15 Istanbul League titles. Former president of the club, Özhan Canaydın, was a former player of the basketball team.

The men's basketball department of Fenerbahçe was founded in 1913 and achieved considerable success when the sport established itself in Turkey. Fenerbahçe have won seven Istanbul League titles and three national championship titles in 1957, 1959 and 1965, just before the professional nationwide league was founded in 1966, and participated in the European Champions Cup in 1960 and 1966. Their fans had to wait until 1991 for another title, when Levent Topsakal, Larry Richard, and head coach Çetin Yılmaz led Fenerbahçe to the Turkish League title over Tofaş.

Basketball rivalry

Fenerbahçe consider themselves as the pioneers of basketball in Turkey, boasting their success in winning more trophies, including the 2016–17 EuroLeague title, which is marked as the first ever EuroLeague title won by a Turkish basketball club.

Culture
The clubs originate from two different sides of the Bosphorus. Fenerbahçe SK were founded in Kadıköy that is located on the Asian side of Istanbul, while Galatasaray SK were founded in the Beyoğlu district, on the European side of Istanbul. Both clubs naturally draw the majority of their support from the side of the city that they are native to, but maintain a significant majority of support drawn from the rest of Turkey.

Honours

List of all matches

Statistics

Head to Head

Last update: 26 February 2020

See also
 The Intercontinental Derby
 Beşiktaş–Fenerbahçe rivalry (basketball)
 Beşiktaş–Galatasaray rivalry (basketball)

External links
Fenerbahçe SK Official Website
Galatasaray SK Official Website

References

Turkish Basketball Super League teams
Basketball rivalries
Fenerbahçe S.K.
Galatasaray Basketball